Pierre Bourguignon (6 February 1942 – 27 March 2019) was a French politician who was a member of the National Assembly from 1981 to 1993, then from 1997 to 2012. He represented the Seine-Maritime department, and was a member of the Socialiste, radical, citoyen et divers gauche group. He was member of Socialist Party throughout his time serving in the National Assembly. Bourguignon was mayor of Sotteville-lès-Rouen from 1989 to 2014.

Personal life
Bourguignon was born in Rouen, Seine-Maritime, and was educated at the Lycée Pierre-Corneille in Rouen.

Bourguignon died of a heart attack on 27 March 2019 in Saint-Aubin-lès-Elbeuf, Seine-Maritime, at the age of 77.

References

1942 births
2019 deaths
Politicians from Rouen
Unified Socialist Party (France) politicians
Socialist Party (France) politicians
Deputies of the 7th National Assembly of the French Fifth Republic
Deputies of the 8th National Assembly of the French Fifth Republic
Deputies of the 9th National Assembly of the French Fifth Republic
Deputies of the 11th National Assembly of the French Fifth Republic
Deputies of the 12th National Assembly of the French Fifth Republic
Deputies of the 13th National Assembly of the French Fifth Republic
Mayors of places in Normandy
Lycée Pierre-Corneille alumni
Officiers of the Légion d'honneur